ʔálʔal Café (pronounced "all-all") is a restaurant in Pioneer Square, Seattle, in the U.S. state of Washington. It opened in 2022.

Description

ʔálʔal, which means "home" in Lushootseed, is a restaurant in downtown Seattle's Pioneer Square neighborhood. The café operates on the ground floor of a Chief Seattle Club housing complex for people of Native descent. According to Anthony Monzon of KSTW, the business aims to "[reclaim] and [reintroduce]" Indigenous cuisine of the Americas "in a modern café setting". The menu has included blue corn mush with wojape, wild rice bowls with berry vinaigrette, braised bison tacos with pickled onions, Northwest salmon, and coffee. Many ingredients are sourced from Native producers. The café's interior features Native artworks, including a mural which depicts the transition from the pre-Columbian era to modern society.

History

ʔálʔal Café opened on November 29, 2022. The business is owned and operated by the nonprofit organization Chief Seattle Club, which provides services for Indigenous people living in urban areas. Profits from the café support the organization.

References

External links

 
 
 ʔálʔal Café at Chief Seattle Club

2022 establishments in Washington (state)
Indigenous cuisine of the Americas
Pioneer Square, Seattle
Restaurants established in 2022
Restaurants in Seattle